Cape Leveque is at the northernmost tip of the Dampier Peninsula in the Kimberley region of Western Australia. Nevertheless, the Cape's sandy beaches are attracting an increasing number of visitors.

The  lighthouse was commissioned at Cape Leveque on 9 August 1911. The lighthouse marks the western entrance of King Sound.

Cape Leveque was a camping ground for ancient nomadic people of northern Australia and is probably still being used today. Their huge middens overshadow the small caravan park resting on the shores of the Indian Ocean. Wild turtles and a multitude of sea birds nest on the shores and collect seafood off the exposed rocks at low tide along the shore down the coast to Broome in the southern part of the peninsula. Humpback whales come to give birth in the area, and rest and play among the sheltered islands off the Dampier Peninsula.

The traditional owners of the area are the Bardi people.

The soil is dry and sandy, destitute of water, except you make wells, yet producing divers sorts of trees."

See also

 List of lighthouses in Australia

References

External links
 Meteorological information
 Lighthouse keeper story

Leveque
Lighthouses completed in 1911
Lighthouses in Western Australia
Kimberley coastline of Western Australia
1911 establishments in Australia